Let Them Eat Chaos is the second studio album by English poet and spoken word artist Kae Tempest, the follow up to their Mercury Prize-nominated debut Everybody Down. The album follows seven individuals who all live on the same street who have never met each other before. But then at 4:18 in the morning, a storm causes these seven people to leave their homes and see each other for the very first time.

Critical reception

According to review aggregator Metacritic, Let Them Eat Chaos has a score of 84 out of 100, indicating "universal acclaim."

Track listing

Charts

References

External links
 

2016 albums
Albums produced by Dan Carey (record producer)
Kae Tempest albums
Fiction Records albums
2010s spoken word albums
Spoken word albums by English artists